The 2015 European Masters Games was the third edition of the multi-sport event for masters sport, which took place between 1–11 October 2015 in Nice, France. 7200 participants from 76 countries competed in 27 sports.

Sports
https://web.archive.org/web/20160417025444/https://registration.emg-nice2015.fr/en/sports

Archery (40 to 60)
Athletics (30 to 100)
10 km Road Race (Running)
Badminton
Basketball
Beach volleyball
Canoe Ocean Racing
Cycling
Dancesport
Fencing
Football
Handball
Judo
Karate

Orienteering
Petanque
Rowing (Sea Rowing)
Rugby
Sailing
Squash
Swimming
Open Water Swimming
Taekwondo
Table Tennis
Tennis
Triathlon
Volleyball
Weightlifting

Medal table

Results
 https://web.archive.org/web/20150216092333/http://www.nice.fr/fr/sports/european-masters-games-2015
 https://web.archive.org/web/20160817065004/https://registration.emg-nice2015.fr/en/ranking
 https://web.archive.org/web/20160402182909/https://registration.emg-nice2015.fr/en/results
 https://web.archive.org/web/20160417025444/https://registration.emg-nice2015.fr/en/sports
 https://www.imga.ch/assets/Uploads/Reports/EMG-RAPPORT-FINAL-FR.pdf
 https://www.imga.ch/assets/Uploads/Results/Tir-a-larc.pdf 
 https://www.imga.ch/assets/Uploads/Results/resultats-athletisme.pdf 
 https://www.imga.ch/assets/Uploads/Results/Badminton-emg2015.pdf
 https://www.imga.ch/assets/Uploads/Results/resultats-basket.pdf
 https://www.imga.ch/assets/Uploads/Results/resultats-beach-volley.pdf
 https://www.imga.ch/assets/Uploads/Results/Cyclisme.pdf
 https://www.imga.ch/assets/Uploads/Results/Danse-sportive.pdf
 https://www.imga.ch/assets/Uploads/Results/Escrime.pdf
 https://www.imga.ch/assets/Uploads/Results/resultats-football.pdf
 https://www.imga.ch/assets/Uploads/Results/resultats-handball.pdf
 https://www.imga.ch/assets/Uploads/Results/Judo.pdf
 https://www.imga.ch/assets/Uploads/Results/resultats-karatC.pdf
 https://www.imga.ch/assets/Uploads/Results/Natation-en-eau-libre.pdf
 https://www.imga.ch/assets/Uploads/Results/Course-dorientation.pdf
 https://www.imga.ch/assets/Uploads/Results/Course-sur-route.pdf
 https://www.imga.ch/assets/Uploads/Results/resultats-aviron.pdf
 https://www.imga.ch/assets/Uploads/Results/resultats-rugby.pdf
 https://www.imga.ch/assets/Uploads/Results/Kayak-de-mer.pdf
 https://www.imga.ch/assets/Uploads/Results/resultats-squash.pdf 
 https://www.imga.ch/assets/Uploads/Results/Natation.pdf
 https://www.imga.ch/assets/Uploads/Results/RESULTATS-tennis-table.pdf
 https://www.imga.ch/assets/Uploads/Results/resultats-taekwondo.pdf
 https://www.imga.ch/assets/Uploads/Results/resultats-tennis.pdf
 https://www.imga.ch/assets/Uploads/Results/resultats-volley.pdf
 https://www.imga.ch/assets/Uploads/Results/Halterophilie.pdf

References

External links
 2015 European Masters Games

Masters Games
European Masters Games
European Masters Games
Sport in Nice
Multi-sport events in France
International sports competitions hosted by France
European Masters Games